William F. Giles (March 10, 1932 – May 28, 1998) was an American football player and coach.  He served as the head football coach at Chadron State College in Chadron, Nebraska from 1967 to 1971 and at Fort Hays State University in Hays, Kansas from 1972 until 1978, compiling a career college football coaching record of 51–64–3.  A native of Alliance, Nebraska, Giles played college football as an end at the University of Nebraska–Lincoln from 1951 to 1954.

Head coaching record

References

External links
 Bill Giles' obituary, alongside Bill Meek's

1932 births
1998 deaths
American football ends
Chadron State Eagles football coaches
Fort Hays State Tigers football coaches
Hiram Scott Scotties football coaches
Nebraska–Kearney Lopers football coaches
Sportspeople from Chicago
People from Alliance, Nebraska
Nebraska Cornhuskers football players
Players of American football from Chicago